Brian Ransom (born July 9, 1960) is an American former gridiron football quarterback who played one season with the Montreal Alouettes of the Canadian Football League (CFL). Ransom played college football at Tennessee State University and attended North High School in Nashville, Tennessee. He was also a member of the Houston Oilers of the National Football League (NFL), but saw no playing time.

References

External links
 Just Sports Stats
 CFLapedia stats

Living people
1960 births
American football quarterbacks
Canadian football quarterbacks
Houston Oilers players
Montreal Alouettes players
Tennessee State Tigers football players
Sportspeople from Nashville, Tennessee
Players of American football from Tennessee
African-American players of American football
African-American players of Canadian football
21st-century African-American people
20th-century African-American sportspeople